Bowles West Peak is a peak rising to 678 m at the western extremity of Bowles Ridge in eastern Livingston Island in Antarctica.  The peak has precipitous and partly ice free western slopes and overlooks Perunika Glacier to the southwest.

The feature takes its name from Mount Bowles, the summit of the eponymous ridge.

Location

The peak was roughly mapped by the British in 1968 and the Spanish in 1991.  The peak was mapped by  Bulgaria from a 1995-96 topographic survey.

Maps
 L.L. Ivanov et al. Antarctica: Livingston Island and Greenwich Island, South Shetland Islands. Scale 1:100000 topographic map. Sofia: Antarctic Place-names Commission of Bulgaria, 2005.
 L.L. Ivanov. Antarctica: Livingston Island and Greenwich, Robert, Snow and Smith Islands. Scale 1:120000 topographic map.  Troyan: Manfred Wörner Foundation, 2009.
 A. Kamburov and L. Ivanov. Bowles Ridge and Central Tangra Mountains: Livingston Island, Antarctica. Scale 1:25000 map. Sofia: Manfred Wörner Foundation, 2023.

References
 Bowles West Peak. SCAR Composite Gazetteer of Antarctica
 Bulgarian Antarctic Gazetteer. Antarctic Place-names Commission. (details in Bulgarian, basic data in English)

External links
 Bowles West Peak. Copernix satellite image

Mountains of Livingston Island